Colombia loses 2,000 km2 of forest annually to deforestation, according to the United Nations in 2003. Some suggest that this figure is as high as 3,000 km2 due to illegal logging in the region.
Deforestation results mainly from logging for timber, small-scale agricultural ranching, mining, development of energy resources such as hydro-electricity, infrastructure, cocaine production, and farming.

Deforestation in Colombia is mainly targeted at primary rainforests. This has a profound ecological impact in that Colombia is extremely rich in biodiversity, with 10% of the world's species, making it the second most biologically diverse country on Earth.

Causes and effects
A contributing factor to deforestation in Colombia is the national Plan Pacifico which is intended to raise revenue to develop the economy. The plan includes exploitation of Colombia's rainforests for the extraction of precious natural resources for exportation.

Under the regime of President Virgilio Barco Vargas (1986–1990), a development scheme was initiated involving $4.5 billion in investments to develop the Colombian Pacific Coast in Choco Department. Around 2.2% of the total forest area in Colombia began to be removed each year for wood and to make paper or to provide the clearings needed for palm plantations and agricultural production and commercial shrimp farming. In a concerted effort to enhance trade, Plan Pacifico has attempted to complete the 54 kilometer missing section of the Pan-American Highway between Colombia and Panama spanning the ecologically rich Darién Gap.

The construction of the Puente Terrestre Inter-Oceanico (PTI), the land bridge between the Pacific and Atlantic Oceans near Panama, consisting of a railway, road, canal, and oil pipeline has had a major impact on the environment and forest removal in the region. Other plans for road construction throughout Chocó which intended to catapult economic production in Colombia have had unintended negative consequences.

Deforestation has been responsible for the erosion of riverbanks which have affected the levels of river beds, which has had negative effects on aquatic life and fish stocks as well as on transportation and navigation because of silting. This forest clearing also accounts for great habitat destruction for creatures dwelling in the Colombian forests. For example, the cotton-top tamarin is considered to be critically endangered, and ranks highly on the list of "The World's 25 Most Endangered Primates." Habitat destruction through forest clearing is the main cause of this collapse, and cotton-top tamarins have lost more than three-quarters of their original habitat to deforestation. Local initiatives, like Proyecto Tití for cotton-top tamarins, have been created to raise awareness of such cases.

The current administration is expanding palm oil and sugar cane production by encouraging large scale plantations, and demand for agrofuels has also had a significant impact on Colombia's forests, biodiversity, and local communities. Exploitation of communities through palm oil expansion has often resulted in violence and abuse of human rights. NGOs working in Colombia have recorded 113 deaths as a result of land-based conflicts over palm oil production in Curvaradó and Jiguamiandó River Basin in the Chocó region, where paramilitaries associated with plantation companies have been accused of exploiting lands collectively held by Afro-Colombian communities. The coastal lowland forests of Chocó province that are most affected by palm oil production are amongst the most biodiverse forests on Earth, home to 7,000 to 8,000 species, with over 2,000 endemic plant species and 100 endemic bird species. Mining has also contributed to deforestation, particularly in the recent years, representing up to 6% of national deforestation (2017), with large clear cuts observed in legal concessions of Antioquia (gold producer) or La Guajira (coal producer).

The biologically rich forests of Colombia's Pacific Coast have also been affected by gold mining and cocoa production. One figure obtained in the mid-1990s estimated that gold mining activities were responsible for the clearance of 800 square kilometres of forest per year in Colombia, in addition to increased siltation in rivers and mercury contamination.

The cultivation, production, and distribution of illegal narcotics in Colombia has also had a profound impact on deforestation and loss of biodiversity in the country. An estimated  are allocated each year to grow coca, marijuana, and opium poppies resulting in the direct removal of primary forest to provide for the trade. Particularly affected are the forests of the Colombian Andes where at least 73% of this precious ecosystem has been affected by drug cultivation and migration of people for illegal resource extraction. The area is of prime importance for Colombia's water supply, and a disruption of soils and the water table arising from the removal of forest cover is of major concern to the climatic patterns of the country.

Poverty and inequality in land tenure and use also play a role in deforestation in Colombia. Landowners who make up 3% of Colombia's population own over 70% of arable land, while 57% of the poor farmers barely survive on 2.8% of the land. Inequality and poverty in Colombia are worsened by the fact that the country is striving to develop its market economy with cash crops for export to generate income, increasing the marginalization of farmers at a local level.

Response
Colombia has made great strides in protecting vast areas of land from deforestation through the creation of national parks; however, enforcement is by no means completely effective. The sale of protected land through government corruption is not uncommon. One notorious example is the attempted government conversion of the Tayrona forest on Colombia's Atlantic Coast into a national park in 1980. The Great Alliance against Deforestation is an initiative formed by the private sector and the Ministry of Environment and Sustainable Developing. The initiative counts on the help of different sectors of the civil society, including artists like Systema Solar and Bomba Estéreo.

La Minga Indígena
In January 2020, the Colombian Government consulted with indigenous Amazonian tribal communities for suggestions on how to spend over $7 million to fight deforestation in the Amazon. However, protests have since broken out across Colombia by La Minga Indígena, thousands of indigenous activists demanding more proactive implementation of the peace agreement to promote environmental protections. Indigenous people worldwide have made essential contributions to the pursuing of environmental justice.

These indigenous groups are acting as environmental protectors and land defenders for the Amazon from deforestation. “Minga” is the Quechua word meaning the coming together of strangers around a shared objective or goal. Indigenous protestors are requesting legal protections and defense for Mother Earth after human and environmental rights violations.

Deforestation and land grabbing increased by 44% since the peace agreement between FARC and the government was signed in 2016, after which FARC withdrew from the forests. FARC enforced an environmental ‘gunpoint conservation policy’ where farmers (often indigenous) had to maintain a portion of their lands forested, or risked violent repercussions. The peace agreement intended to reduce violence in the Amazon, but facilitated land grabbing for illicit crop growth (cocaine) and gold mining by former FARC dissidents, leading to violence against indigenous communities and illegal deforestation.

Deforestation reduces Amazon biodiversity and illegal activities pollute rivers and natural habitats to species and indigenous groups. Since 2016, over 300 indigenous leaders and 600 peasant, Afro and union leaders have been killed in Colombia. La Minga Indígena is receiving political support by Claudia López for more proactive implementation of the peace agreement to enforce protections against illegal deforestation.

See also 
 Environmental issues in Colombia

References

Forestry in Colombia
Colombia
Environmental issues in Colombia
Deforestation, Colombia
Palm oil production in Colombia
Trees of Colombia